The Miles M.9 Master was a British two-seat monoplane advanced trainer designed and built by aviation company Miles Aircraft Ltd. It was inducted in large numbers into both the Royal Air Force (RAF) and Fleet Air Arm (FAA) during the Second World War.

The Master can trace its origins back to the earlier M.9 Kestrel demonstrator aircraft. Following the failure of the rival de Havilland Don as a satisfactory trainer aircraft, the RAF ordered 500 M9A Master advanced trainers to meet its needs. Once in service, it provided a fast, strong and fully aerobatic aircraft that functioned as an excellent introduction to the high performance British fighter aircraft of the day: the Spitfire and Hurricane. Throughout its production life, thousands of aircraft and various variants of the Master were produced, the latter being largely influenced by engine availability. Numerous Masters were modified to enable their use as glider tows. The Master also served as the basis for the Miles Martinet, a dedicated target tug adopted by the RAF.

Perhaps the most radical use of the aircraft was the M.24 Master Fighter. Armed with six .303 in machine guns, it was intended to function as an emergency fighter during the Battle of Britain; this model did not ultimately see combat. Ordinary trainer models could also be fitted with armaments, including a single .303 in Vickers machine gun and eight bombs, albeit intended for training purposes only. Beyond the British air services, other nations also chose to adopt the Master, including the South African Air Force, United States Army Air Force (USAAF), Irish Air Corps, Royal Egyptian Air Force, Turkish Air Force, and the Portuguese Air Force. While thousands of Masters were manufactured, no complete examples have been preserved.

Development

Background
The M.9A Master I was based on the M.9 Kestrel trainer that was first demonstrated at the Hendon Air show in July 1937, although this aircraft never entered production. The M.9 Kestrel, powered by a single Rolls-Royce Kestrel XVI V-12 engine, capable of generating up to 745 hp (555 kW), could attain a maximum speed of 296 mph (477 km/h). The British Air Ministry had previously selected the rival de Havilland Don to meet Specification T.6/36, which called for an advanced trainer aircraft; however, this aircraft would prove to be a failure. Still requiring an aircraft to perform the duties intended for the Don, the RAF placed a large order on 11 June 1938 for 500 examples of a modified version of the Kestrel, designated M.9A Master, at a cost of £2 million. This was claimed to be Britain's largest ever contract for a training aircraft at the time.

Upon receipt of this order, Miles had the prototype M.9 rebuilt into a representative prototype for the Master. Alterations included the installation of a lower-powered (715 hp (535 kW)) Kestrel XXX engine, of which there were large surplus stocks available, along with extensive revisions to the airframe, which involved the adoption of a new cockpit canopy, a modified rear fuselage and tail, along with the repositioning of the radiator from underneath the nose to the underside of the wing's centre-section. These modifications came at the cost of a significantly reduced maximum speed over the M.9; despite this, the Master was a relatively fast and manoeuvrable trainer. According to aviation periodical Flight, Miles had designed the Master to fulfil their vision of an effective trainer aircraft being one that could match the performance of, and possess similar characteristics to, that of the frontline RAF monoplane fighters of the day, these being the Supermarine Spitfire and the Hawker Hurricane.

Into flight
On 31 March 1939, the first true production Master I conducted its maiden flight. According to Flight, the first production examples were being delivered during late July of that year. The Master had entered RAF service just prior to the start of the Second World War Eventually, 900 Mk. I and Mk. IA Masters were constructed. This total included 26 built as the M.24 Master Fighter which were modified to a single-seat configuration, and armed with six .303 in machine guns for use as an emergency fighter; this model never saw any combat use.

When production of the Kestrel engine ceased, a new variant of the Master was designed that used an air-cooled Bristol Mercury XX radial engine, capable of producing 870 hp (650 kW), instead. Thus configured, on 30 October 1939, the first M.19 Master II prototype made its first flight; 1,748 aircraft were eventually built. After the Lend-Lease programme provided a supply of engines from the United States to Britain, a third variant of the Master, designated M.27 Master III, was designed, which was powered by the American-built Pratt & Whitney Twin Wasp Junior, a two-row radial engine that could generate 825 hp (615 kW). A total of 602 Master IIIs were constructed.

In a typical trainer configuration, the Master was equipped to carry eight practice bombs, plus a single .303 in Vickers machine gun that was mounted in the front fuselage. During 1942, it was decided to have the wings of all variants clipped by three feet (c. one metre); this modification reduced the stress imposed upon the wings while also increasing the aircraft's manoeuvrability.

Production

A total of 3,249 Masters were built by Phillips and Powis Aircraft Limited at Woodley, Berkshire; South Marston, Swindon, Wiltshire; and Doncaster, South Yorkshire. This was the largest number produced of any Miles aircraft type prior to production of the newer Miles Martinet taking precedence during 1942.

The mass production of this aeroplane at Woodley required a major expansion of the original Phillips & Powis factory, which was officially opened on 27 January 1939 by the Secretary of State for Air, Sir Kingsley Wood. This facility was outfitted with a pioneering moving track assembly line, which is believed to be the first such facility in a British aircraft factory. A similar facility was also installed in the company's shadow factory at South Marston by the end of 1940.

Design
The Miles Master was a tandem-seat low-wing cantilever monoplane, powered by a single reciprocating engine. Initial models used the Kestrel XXX engine; capable of providing up to 745 hp (555 kW), this powerplant enabled the aircraft to achieve a maximum speed of 296 mph (477 km/h), which reportedly made the Master as fast as the single-seat biplane fighters of 1935. The inverted gull-shaped wing of the Master was a major distinguishing factor of the aircraft and was adopted, despite higher production costs, due to its performance benefits, permitting the stowage of both the retractable undercarriage and fuel tanks; aside from this shaping, the wing's design largely conformed with traditional approaches. It features hydraulically-actuated split flaps along its trailing edge, their position being indicated electronically on the cockpit's instrumentation planel. The wing's center-section also accommodates a machine gun.

While the Master had incorporated relatively advanced aerodynamic characteristics (intended to mimic frontline fighters) for a contemporary trainer aircraft, it used a conventional structure, comprising an oval-section fuselage covered by a plywood skin, featuring a semi-monocoque approach. Forward of the tandem cockpits, the nose is strengthened by a metal former that provides protection against nose-overs, a common occurrence amongst trainee pilots when flying aircraft with a 'taildragger' undercarriage. The tail section had an orthodox cantilever structure, the tailplane being mounted directly on top of the fuselage; according to Flight, the tailplane's aerodynamics were designed to facilitate easy spin recovery. The Kestrel engine is mounted on tubular steel bearings which was designed to facilitate engine removal for ease of maintenance via the undoing of only four main bolts along with the connecting leads. Further maintenance savings were made via the engine's derating, allowing for a longer interval between overhauls.

The Master was furnished with a constant-speed propeller, which was interchangeable between Rotol and de Havilland units. The Kestrel engine of early-built aircraft incorporated various auxiliary drives to power both vacuum and hydraulic pumps, along with an air compressor and a 500-watt electrical generator. Cooling for the water and oil systems was provided via a duct running underneath the fuselage. Fuel was housed in a pair of fuel tanks, each containing up to 36 gallons, accommodated within the wings; the oil tank is mounted behind a fireproof bulkhead while the water tank is mounted in front of the engine. The retractable undercarriage is operated via two separate hydraulic systems along with a hand-pump as backup; the brakes are also hydraulically-actuated.

The cockpit of the Master was designed with considerable attention to best facilitate its use as a trainer aircraft, including for ease of use and comfort. The positions of the two flying crew, the student in front and the instructor behind, was staggered; the rear position is 12-inches higher to provide the instructor with greater visibility. Mid-flight, an instructor was able to disconnect several of the student pilot's controls, such as the brakes, using various cut-outs provided. The forward windscreen is composed of molded Perspex and is furnished with a reflector-type gun sight, providing an optically-perfect view of a target. Two small panels can be opened to aid visibility while flying in poor weather conditions, sun blinds are also incorporated. Catches on either side of the sliding canopy allow for the panels to be rapidly detached, facilitating faster bailing-out during an emergency. Other emergency equipment included a Graviner fire extinguisher mounted behind the rear seat and emergency hydraulic controls set into the floor on the cockpit.

Operational history
Typical service use of the Master primarily revolved around (Pilot) Advanced Flying Units, where they were used for training aircrew in preparation for service with frontline squadrons. Amongst other parts of the training syllabus, pilots would often be first exposed to fighter tactics while flying the aircraft. By 1942, advertisements claimed that the Master was being flown by every RAF fighter pilot-in-training.

Several hundred Master IIs were either delivered in, or subsequently converted to, a configuration that allowed their use in the glider-towing role. Such aircraft would have the lower portion of their rudder cut away to allow fitting of a towing hook. Starting in 1942, Miles Masters were extensively used as tugs for General Aircraft Hotspur gliders at various Glider Training Schools. Examples were also operated by multiple Anti-aircraft Co-operation Units of the RAF as a liaison aircraft with British Army units.

Initially, the type was mainly used for training, thus few aircraft entered squadron service. Known deployments were to No. 287 Squadron between February and August 1942, to No. 286 Squadron from November 1944 to February 1945, and to No. 613 Squadron between August 1941 and October 1943.

The Master II was also used for target tug purposes at the Central Gunnery School whilst the School was based at RAF Sutton Bridge from April 1942 to March 1944. In this role, they pulled the drogue targets required for aerial gunnery training by pupils at the Pilot Gunnery Instructors' Training Wing. The Miles Martinet, a derivative of the Master, was a developed specifically to be a target tug and would see widespread use in this capacity.

RAF stocks were frequently diverted to support several of the air services of the Allies and other non-hostile nations. Such diversions included 426 aircraft to the South African Air Force, 52 to the Fleet Air Arm, nine to the United States Army Air Force (USAAF) units based in Britain, 23 to the Royal Egyptian Air Force, 23 to Turkish Air Force, two to Portuguese Air Force, and fourteen to the Irish Air Corps.

Despite having been produced in the thousands, there are no known surviving aircraft of the type today, although a few outer wings and other parts are held by several aviation museums in Britain.

Variants
Miles M.9A Master
Prototype modified from the private venture M.9 Kestrel trainer prototype.
Miles M.9B Master I
Initial production of the Master with Kestrel engine, 900 built at Woodley.
Miles M.9C Master IA
Improved design with a sliding hood and wider span tailplane, 400 built at Woodley.
Miles M.19 Master II
Production with Bristol Mercury engines, 1748 built at Woodley and South Marston.
Miles M.19 Master GT.II
Modified Master II as a glider tug, at least 133 conversions and 290 Master IIs were built as GT.IIs at Woodley and South Marston.
Miles M.24 Master Fighter
Stop-gap fighter version of Master I with rear seat removed and six 0.303 Browning machine-guns in the wings, 25 conversions of Master Is on the production line.
Miles M.27 Master III
Improved Master II. 602 built at South Marston.
Miles M.31 Master IV
Proposed improved design to give the instructor a better field of view, none built.

Military operators

Belgian Air Force

Royal Egyptian Air Force – 26 aircraft supplied in 1944 from RAF stocks

French Air Force

Irish Air Corps – 12 former RAF Master IIs were purchased (six in 1943 and six in 1945), 

Portuguese Air Force - 4 former RAF Master IIs were delivered in 1943 and ten Master IIIs delivered form 1941.

South African Air Force – 453 Master IIs were supplied to South Africa (including 25 which were lost at sea and did not arrive).

Turkish Air Force

Royal Air Force

No. 4 Squadron RAF
No. 16 Squadron RAF
No. 25 Squadron RAF
No. 26 Squadron RAF
No. 73 Squadron RAF
No. 85 Squadron RAF
No. 87 Squadron RAF
No. 105 Squadron RAF
No. 140 Squadron RAF
No. 152 Squadron RAF
No. 168 Squadron RAF
No. 219 Squadron RAF
No. 222 Squadron RAF
No. 225 Squadron RAF
No. 238 Squadron RAF
No. 239 Squadron RAF
No. 242 Squadron RAF
No. 245 Squadron RAF
No. 249 Squadron RAF
No. 253 Squadron RAF
No. 257 Squadron RAF
No. 264 Squadron RAF
No. 266 Squadron RAF
No. 286 Squadron RAF
No. 287 Squadron RAF
No. 302 Polish Fighter Squadron
No. 306 Polish Fighter Squadron
No. 307 Polish Night Fighter Squadron
No. 308 Polish Fighter Squadron
No. 414 Squadron RCAF
No. 460 Squadron RAAF
No. 504 Squadron RAF
No. 521 Squadron RAF
No. 600 Squadron RAF
No. 607 Squadron RAF
No. 610 Squadron RAF
No. 613 Squadron RAF
No. 615 Squadron RAF
No. 616 Squadron RAF

No. 5 Flying Training School RAF
No. 8 Flying Training School RAF
No. 9 Flying Training School RAF
No. 14 Flying Training School RAF
No. 15 Flying Training School RAF
No. 6 Operational Training Unit RAF
No. 41 Operational Training Unit RAF
No. 52 Operational Training Unit RAF
No. 53 Operational Training Unit RAF
No. 55 Operational Training Unit RAF
No. 56 Operational Training Unit RAF
No. 57 Operational Training Unit RAF
No. 58 Operational Training Unit RAF
No. 60 Operational Training Unit RAF
No. 61 Operational Training Unit RAF
Central Flying School

Fleet Air Arm – about 200 Master Is transferred from the Royal Air Force.

748 Naval Air Squadron
759 Naval Air Squadron
760 Naval Air Squadron
761 Naval Air Squadron
762 Naval Air Squadron
780 Naval Air Squadron
781 Naval Air Squadron
785 Naval Air Squadron
798 Naval Air Squadron

United States Army Air Forces – A total of 44 Masters were loaned to the USAAF for communications duties and target tugs for use in the United Kingdom.

Specifications (M.19 Master Mk.II)

See also

Notes

References

Citations

Bibliography

 Amos, Peter. "RAF Piston Trainer No. 10: Miles M.9A Master I". Aeroplane Monthly, August 1980, Vol. 8, No. 8. pp. 412–418.
 Amos, Peter. "RAF Piston Trainer No. 10: Miles M.19 and M.27 Master II and III". Aeroplane Monthly, September 1980, Vol. 8, No. 9. pp. 460–464.
 Amos, Peter and Don Lambert Brown. Miles Aircraft Since 1925, Volume 1. London: Putnam Aeronautical, 2000. .
 Amos, Peter Miles Aircraft – The Wartime Years Tonbridge, Kent, England:Air-Britain Historians Ltd, 2012. 
 Brown, Don Lambert. Miles Aircraft Since 1925. London: Putnam & Company Ltd., 1970. .
 Jane, Fred T. Jane's All the World's Aircraft 1945/6. London: Sampson Low Marston, 1946.  (1970 David & Charles reprint).
 Jefford, C.G. RAF Squadrons, a Comprehensive Record of the Movement and Equipment of all RAF Squadrons and their Antecedents since 1912. Shrewsbury, Shropshire, UK: Airlife Publishing, 2001. .
 Lukins, A.H. and D.A. Russell. The Book of Miles Aircraft. Leicester, UK: The Harborough Publishing Company Ltd., 1946.
 March, Daniel M. British Warplanes of World War II. London: Aerospace Publishing, 1998. .
 Mondey, David. The Hamlyn Concise Guide to British Aircraft of World War II. London: Chancellor Press, 1994. .
 Temple, Julian C. Wings Over Woodley – The Story of Miles Aircraft and the Adwest Group. Bourne End, Bucks, UK: Aston Publications, 1987. .
 "Trainer De Luxe." Flight, 27 July 1939. pp. 77–80.

External links

 Austin & Longbridge Aircraft Production
 Miles Master M9A Trainer
 Miles Master as model on IPMS Stockholm pages

1930s British military trainer aircraft
World War II British trainer aircraft
Master
Glider tugs
Single-engined tractor aircraft
Low-wing aircraft
Aircraft first flown in 1939
Inverted gull-wing aircraft